Wali Muhammad Wali  (1667–1707), also known as Wali Dakhani, Wali Gujarati, and Wali Aurangabadi, was a classical Urdu poet from India.

He is considered by many scholars to be the father of Urdu poetry, being the first established poet to have composed ghazals in the Urdu language and compiled a divan (a collection of ghazals where the entire alphabet is used at least once as the last letter to define the rhyme pattern).
 
Before Wali, Indian Ghazals were composed in Persian, almost being replicated in thought and style from the original Persian masters like Saa'di, Jami and Khaqani. Wali began, using not only an Indian language, but Indian themes, idioms and imagery in his ghazals. It is said that his visit to Delhi in 1700, along with his divan of Urdu ghazals created a ripple in the literary circles of the north, inspiring them to produce stalwarts like Zauq, Sauda and Mir.

Early life
Born in 1667 at Aurangabad, an important city in the present Maharashtra State which was part of The kingdom of Hyderabad. He loved travelling, which he regarded as a means of education. He visited Delhi, Surat, Burhanpur and also undertook pilgrimage to Mecca and Medina.

Career
Wali Mohammed Wali's visit to Delhi in 1700 is considered to be of great significance for Urdu Ghazals. It was believed that he introduced deccani mushaira to Delhi. His simple, sensuous and melodious poems in Urdu, awakened the Persian loving poets of Delhi to the beauty and capability of "Rekhta" (the old name for Urdu) as a medium of poetic expression. Wali Mohammed Wali's visit thus stimulated the growth and development of Urdu Ghazal in Delhi.

He died in Ahmedabad in 1707 in what is now Gujarat state, and was buried in the same city.

Genre
Although Wali tried his hand at a variety of verse forms including the masnavi, qasida, mukhammas, and the rubai., the ghazal is his speciality. He wrote 473 ghazals containing 3,225 couplets (Ashaar). His poems were simple, sensuous & melodious. He was a trend setter in classical poetry who helped establish Urdu ghazal in Delhi by inspiring different poets to write in Urdu It is believed that Wali started to have established the tradition of writing ghazals in Urdu and also influencing the other writers when he visited Delhi. Before that, the preferred language for ghazals was Persian.

Some of his famous couplets are:
Jisay Ishq Ka Teer Kaari Lagay
Use Zindagi Jag Mein Bhaari Lagay
Naa Chode Mohabbat Daame Marg Tak
Jisay Yaar Jaanisoon Yaari Lagay
Naa Howe Use Jag Mein Hargiz Qaraar
Jise Ishq Ki Beqaraari Lagay
Har Ek Waqt Mujhe Aashiq Zaar Koon
Pyaare Teri Baat pyaari Lagay
"Wali" Koon Kahe Tu Agar Yak Bachan

Raqeebon Dil Mein Kataari Lagay

Themes
His favorite theme was love – both mystical and earthy – and his characteristic tone was one of cheerful affirmation and acceptance, rather than of melancholy grumbling. He was the first Urdu poet to have started the practice of expressing love from the man's point of view, as against the prevailing convention of impersonating as a woman.

If, on the one hand, Wali unraveled the beauty and richness of the native language as a poetic medium, on the other, he was alive to the vigor and verve of Persian diction and imagery which he successfully incorporated into the body of his verse. He may thus be called the architect of the modern poetic language, which is a skillful blend of Aam Boli and Persian vocabulary. His diction was unique here is one of his famous ghazal.

Memorials
His memorial tomb in Shahibaug, Ahmedabad was attacked by the Hindu mob during riots in 2002 and replaced with makeshift Hanuman temple by Hindu Administration. It was completely razed and the road was constructed overnight. After protests from citizens and literary class of city, the Public Interest Litigation was filed in the Gujarat High Court.

In 2010, a widely acclaimed short film on Wali's life was made by a film-maker Gopal K. Annam.

See also

Muhammad Quli Qutb Shah
Siraj Aurangabadi
Azad Bilgrami
Urdu
Urdu poetry
List of Urdu Poets

References

External links
Wali Mohammed Wali's Poetry
Wali's Biography
Wali Mohammed Wali at Kavita Kosh
Frontline Volume 19 – Issue 10, May 11–24, 2002
 Wali Mohammed Wali Ghazals

1667 births
1707 deaths
Urdu-language poets from India
Urdu-language writers from Mughal India
People from Aurangabad, Maharashtra
18th-century Indian Muslims
Writers from Ahmedabad
Gujarati people
People from Marathwada
17th-century Urdu-language writers
Poets from Gujarat
17th-century Indian poets
18th-century Indian poets